Open Doors is the first studio album by Nigerian Gospel artist Nosa. The album was released by Chocolate City on 14 March 2014. It was supported by the hit single "Always Pray For You", which peaked at number 5 on Nigezie's and peaked at number 6 at Rhythm Radio Afrobeat chart. The album features Chocolate City artist MI. Production was handled by Nosa, Audu Maikori, Eddy Isaacs, Bigfoot of Micworx, Tune x, Ultrasound and Dr Drexx.

Background and production
The album was mixed and mastered by Bigfoot at Micworx Studios, Lagos.

Singles
On  21 January 2013, Nosa released the album's lead single "Always Pray For You". The music video for the single was shot and directed in Lagos by AK One ; it was uploaded onto YouTube on February 7, 2013 and ran for 4 minutes and 5 seconds.

On 15 August 2013, "Why You Love Me" was released by "Why You Love Me" as the album's third single.

On 12 February 2014, "Always on My Mind" was released by "Always on My Mind" as the album's eight single.

Track listing

Personnel
Nosa Omoregie - Primary artist, producer, executive producer 
Jude Abaga  -  featured artist
Ultrasound - Producer
Dr Drexx  - Producer
Bigfoot of Micworx - Producer

References

2014 albums
Nosa (musician) albums
Chocolate City (music label) albums